Lake Mary Ronan State Park is a public recreation area located  northwest of the Flathead Lake community of Dayton, Montana. The state park occupies  on the east side of  Lake Mary Ronan. The lake is 47 feet deep at its deepest spot and is known for kokanee salmon and yellow perch. Twenty-five campsites and a boat ramp are found in the park.

Fishing 
Fishing at Lake Mary Ronan is a popular activity, the lake is stocked for continued enjoyment.

References

External links 
Lake Mary Ronan State Park Montana Fish, Wildlife & Parks

State parks of Montana
Protected areas of Lake County, Montana
Protected areas established in 1967
1967 establishments in Montana